Michał Jerzy Milowicz (born 16 September 1970) is a Polish singer and actor.

He was working in three theatres since beginning of his career:  Studio Buffo (1995–2001), Teatr Muzyczny Roma (2001–2003) and Teatr Muzyczny im. Danuty Baduszkowej in Gdynia (2003). His debut music album called Teraz Wiersz was released in June 2003. He is the team captain in TV Puls music show Singa Dinga since 29 October 2007. In 2006 he was participating in IV season of polish edition of Dancing with the Stars and
III season of polish edition of Dancing on Ice

Actor 
Młode wilki (1995) as policeman
Klan (1997) as driver
Sztos (1997) as student
Ja, Malinowski (1999) as Dziad
Kiler-ów 2-óch (1999) as Radek
Lokatorzy (1999–2005) as Cezary Cwał-Wiśniewski
Chłopaki nie płaczą (2000) as Bolec,
Poranek kojota (2001) as Brylant
Wiedźmin (2001) as Crach an Craite
Zostać Miss (2001) as Zdzisław
Segment '76 (2002)
Rób swoje, ryzyko jest Twoje as Lutek Star
Agentki (2008) as Paweł's boss
Do wesela się zagoi (2009) as former fiance of customer (Elżbieta Romanowska).
Chwila nieuwagi, czyli drugi sztos (2011)
Barwy szczęścia (2012) as Czarek, physical education teacher and Blanka Filipska's schoolmate
Kac Wawa as Bonawentura, army mate

Dubbing 
2011 Crysis 2 – commander C.E.L.L. Lockhard
2009: Arthur and the Revenge of Maltazard – Max
2006: Arthur and the Invisibles – Max
2005: Hoodwinked! – Japeth
2004: Home on the Range – Alameda Slim / Bracia Wacuś
1991: Rock-a-Doodle − Chanticleer

External links 
Official Michał Milowicz's page
Milowicz at Filmweb
Milowicz at Stopklatka

Polish male film actors
Polish male voice actors
1970 births
Living people